The Once a Week Show with Dustin and Sinéad from Sinéad's House Where Dustin Likes to Hang is a television chat/comedy show, broadcast on RTÉ Two in 2007 and 2008. A successor to the more frequently aired Dustin's Daily News, it was presented by Dustin the Turkey of The Den, with his assistant Sinéad Ni Churnain as a co-presenter. More or less exactly the same as the previous show, only with a studio instead of a newsroom, plus the reduced daily to weekly frequency of the show. During the show's run the presenter was selected to represent Ireland at  Eurovision Song Contest 2008.

Episodes

References

External links
 The Once a Week Show at RTÉ Television

2007 Irish television series debuts
2008 Irish television series endings
Irish children's television shows
Irish comedy television shows
Irish television shows featuring puppetry
RTÉ original programming